The Garrick Club is a gentlemen's club in the heart of London founded in 1831. It is one of the oldest members' clubs in the world and, since its inception, has catered to members such as Charles Kean, Henry Irving, Herbert Beerbohm Tree, Arthur Sullivan, Laurence Olivier, Raymond Raikes, Stephen Fry and John Gielgud. From the literary world came writers such as Charles Dickens, H. G. Wells, J. M. Barrie, A. A. Milne, and Kingsley Amis. The visual arts have been represented by painters such as John Everett Millais, Lord Leighton and Dante Gabriel Rossetti.

In 1956 the rights to A. A. Milne's Pooh books were left to four beneficiaries: his family, the Royal Literary Fund, Westminster School and the Garrick Club.

, the club has around 1,400 members (with a seven-year waiting list) including many actors and men of letters in the United Kingdom. New candidates must be proposed by an existing member before election in a secret ballot, the original assurance of the committee being “that it would be better that ten unobjectionable men should be excluded than one terrible bore should be admitted”. 

The Garrick Club is also home to major collections of art, with more than 1,000 paintings, drawings and sculptures on display. It also houses a theatrical library.

History
The Garrick Club was founded at a meeting in the Committee Room at Theatre Royal, Drury Lane, on Wednesday 17 August 1831. Present were James Winston (a former strolling player, manager and important theatre antiquarian), Samuel James Arnold (a playwright and theatre manager), Samuel Beazley (an architect and playwright), General Sir Andrew Barnard (an army officer and hero of the Napoleonic Wars), and Francis Mills (a timber merchant and railway speculator). It was decided to write down a number of names in order to invite them to be original members of the Garrick Club. 

The avowed purpose of the club was to "tend to the regeneration of the Drama". It was to be a place where “actors and men of refinement could meet on equal terms” at a time when actors were not generally considered to be respectable members of society.

The club was named in honour of the actor David Garrick, whose acting and management at the Theatre Royal, Drury Lane in the previous century, had by the 1830s come to represent a golden age of British drama. Less than six months later the members had been recruited and a Club House found and equipped on King Street in Covent Garden. On 1 February 1832, it was reported that the novelist and journalist Thomas Gaspey was the first member to enter at 11am, and that “Mr Beazley gave the first order, (a mutton chop) at ½ past 12.”

The list of those who took up original membership runs like a Who’s Who of the Green Room for 1832: actors such as John Braham, Charles Kemble, William Macready, Charles Mathews and his son Charles James; the playwrights James Planché, Theodore Hook and Thomas Talfourd; scene-painters including Clarkson Frederick Stanfield and Thomas Grieve. Even the patron, the Duke of Sussex, had an element of the theatrical about him, being a well-known mesmerist. To this can be added numerous Barons, Counts, Dukes, Earls and Lords, soldiers, parliamentarians and judges.

The membership would later include Charles Kean, Henry Irving, Herbert Beerbohm Tree, Arthur Sullivan, J. M. Barrie, Arthur Wing Pinero, Laurence Olivier and John Gielgud. From the literary world came writers such as Charles Dickens, William Makepeace Thackeray, Anthony Trollope, H. G. Wells, A. A. Milne (who on his death in 1956 bequeathed the club a quarter of the royalties from his children’s books), and Kingsley Amis. The visual arts has been represented by painters such as John Everett Millais, Lord Leighton and Dante Gabriel Rossetti.

The club’s popularity at the beginning of the 1860s created overcrowding of its original clubhouse. Slum clearance being undertaken just round the corner provided the opportunity to move into a brand-new purpose-built home on what became known as Garrick Street. The move was completed in 1864 and the club remains in this building today.

All new candidates must be proposed by an existing member before election in a secret ballot, the original assurance of the committee being “that it would be better that ten unobjectionable men should be excluded than one terrible bore should be admitted”. This exclusive nature of the club was highlighted when reporter Jeremy Paxman applied to join but was initially blackballed, though he was later admitted, an experience he shares with Henry Irving who despite being the first actor to receive a knighthood had himself been blackballed in 1873.

When the club was founded in 1831 Rule 1 of the Garrick Club Rules and Regulations called for the "formation of a theatrical Library, with works on costume". At a General Meeting on 15 October 1831, the barrister John Adolphus suggested that members should present their duplicate dramatic works to the club, and that these should go some way towards forming a Library. A very valuable collection has thus come together over the years, and its special collections are particularly strong on eighteenth and nineteenth-century theatre.

James Winston, the first Secretary and Librarian of the club, was one of the principal early benefactors and his gifts included minutes from the Theatre Royal, Drury Lane, as well as his own Theatric Tourist. These presentations formed the nucleus of a Library which now holds well over 10,000 items, including plays, manuscripts, prints (bound into numerous extra-illustrated volumes), and many photographs.

Art 

The club holds a remarkable collection of artworks representing the history of British theatre. There are over 1000 paintings, drawings and sculptures, a selection of theatrical memorabilia, and thousands of prints and photographs.

The collection originated with the actor Charles Mathews, one of the original members of the club who had a passion for collecting theatrical portraits; they were once displayed by him in a gallery at his home, Ivy Cottage, in Highgate, north London. Mathews managed to secure a large number of pictures from the collection of Thomas Harris, who had been manager of the Theatre Royal, Covent Garden, and which included paintings by the likes of Johann Zoffany, Francis Hayman and Gainsborough Dupont. He also actively commissioned artists such as Samuel De Wilde to paint all the popular stars of the stage at that time (there are 196 works by De Wilde in the collection). 

Mathews had hoped to sell the collection to the club and it appears that lengthy negotiations were entered into without any result. It was eventually purchased by a wealthy stockbroker and donated to the club, having already hung on its walls for several years.

The collection continued to grow with many being presented by artist members, such as Clarkson Frederick Stanfield and David Roberts, who with fellow scene painter Louis Haghe painted a series of large canvases, especially for the Smoking Room at the old Clubhouse. Roberts’ Temple at Baalbec remains today one of the most important paintings by that artist. Sir John Everett Millais is represented by one of his most important portraits, that of Henry Irving which he painted and presented to the club in 1884.

The picture collection continued to expand throughout the twentieth century with artists such as Edward Seago and Feliks Topolski both represented.

Women 

The club remains "for gentlemen only", which is to say restricted to male members, although women guests are welcome as visitors in most parts of the club. Several past attempts to open the club to women members have failed to attain the necessary two-thirds majority, though the most recent poll, in mid-2015, did garner a majority vote of 50.5%. Baroness Hale, when President of the Supreme Court of the United Kingdom, protested about the club’s continued exclusion of women and the acquiescence of its members in that policy. She has said that "I regard it as quite shocking that so many of my colleagues belong to the Garrick, but they don’t see what all the fuss is about," arguing that judges "should be committed to the principle of equality for all."  In reaction to the latest vote, Dinah Rose KC, a leading barrister specialising in human rights and public law, urged leading legal professionals including members of the Supreme Court, to "reconsider" their membership in the club.

In September 2020, the entrepreneur Emily Bendell threatened a legal challenge over the club's refusal to admit women as members. She asserts that the rule breaches the Equality Act 2010.

Notable deceased members 
In 2011, the Garrick Club newsletter compiled a list of 100 notable deceased members (since updated),

See also
List of London's gentlemen's clubs

References

Further reading

External links
Official website

1831 establishments in England
Gentlemen's clubs in London
Organizations established in 1831